Stewart Williams (born ) is an English former rugby league footballer who played in the 1970s, 1980s and 1990s.

Playing career
Stewart Williams was born in Salford, Lancashire, England.

Club career
Stewart Williams made his début for Wigan in the  6-36 defeat by Bradford Northern at Odsal Stadium, Bradford on 2 April 1985, and he played his last match for Wigan as an Interchange/substitute in the 28-19 victory over Oldham  at the Watersheddings, Oldham on 8 April 1985.

References

1958 births
Living people
Barrow Raiders players
Blackpool Borough players
English rugby league players
Rugby league locks
Rugby league players from Salford
Rugby league second-rows
Salford Red Devils players
Wigan Warriors players